Jacques Marquette is a statue by Gaetano Trentanove of Jacques Marquette, the best-known version being the 1896 marble one installed in the National Statuary Hall Collection in the Capitol in Washington D.C.

Versions

National Statuary Hall Collection 
The statue in the National Statuary Hall Collection is one of two donated by the state of Wisconsin. The work was accepted into the senate in 1896.

Marquette, Michigan 

Another  version of the statue is the 1897 bronze casting located in Pere Marquette Park, Marquette, Michigan which was cast in Florence, Italy and includes two bas reliefs set in the sandstone base.

Mackinac Island, Michigan 

In 1909, a third version was dedicated in Marquette Park on Mackinac Island, Michigan.
A plaster version of the statue is located at the State Historical Society of Wisconsin.

References

External links
 

1896 establishments in Washington, D.C.
1896 sculptures
Bronze sculptures in Michigan
Marble sculptures in Washington, D.C.
Monuments and memorials in Washington, D.C.
Marquette, Jacques
Sculptures of men in Michigan
Sculptures of men in Washington, D.C.
Statues in Michigan
Jacques Marquette